Naomi Shemer (July 13, 1930 – June 26, 2004) was a leading Israeli musician and songwriter, hailed as the "first lady of Israeli song and poetry." Her song "Yerushalayim Shel Zahav" ("Jerusalem of Gold"), written in 1967, became an unofficial second anthem after Israel won the Six-Day War that year and reunited Jerusalem.

Early life
Naomi Sapir was born to Rivka and Meir Sapir (Sapirov) in kvutzat Kinneret, an Israeli kibbutz her parents had helped found, on the shores of the Sea of Galilee. In the 1950s she served in the Israeli Defense Force's Nahal entertainment troupe, and studied music at the Rubin Academy in Jerusalem, and in Tel Aviv with Paul Ben-Haim, Abel Ehrlich, Ilona Vincze-Kraus and Josef Tal.

Songwriting career
Shemer did her own songwriting and composing, set famous poems to music, such as those of the Israeli poet, Rachel, and the American Walt Whitman. She also translated and adapted popular songs into Hebrew, such "Lu Yehi", an adaptation of the Beatles song "Let It Be" in 1973.

In 1963, she composed "Hurshat Ha'Eucalyptus" ("The Eucalyptus Grove"), a song that evokes Kvutzat Kinneret where she was born. It was covered in a recent version by Ishtar. In 1967, she wrote the patriotic song, "Yerushalayim Shel Zahav" (Jerusalem of Gold), which was sung by Shuli Natan and became famous. She wrote it for the Israeli Music Festival. After Israel's victory in the Six-Day War that year, she added another verse celebrating the reunification of Jerusalem. The song "gained the status of an informal second national anthem."

Personal life
She first married actor Gideon Shemer and had a daughter, Lali. They were later divorced. She later married an attorney, Mordechai Horowitz. The two had a son Ariel Horowitz, who also became a musician.

Shemer continued to write her own songs. She died in 2004 of cancer, aged 74. Shortly before her death, she wrote to a friend, saying she had used a Basque folk melody as the basis for her 1967 "anthem," "Jerusalem of Gold". She had always denied it before. The friend and her family decided to publish the account. In 1962, singer Paco Ibáñez performed the Basque melody "Pello Joxepe" (Joseph The Fool), in Israel, when Shemer might have heard it.

Shemer was buried in the cemetery at Kvutzat Kinneret, her place of birth. Alongside her are buried many of the socialist ideologues and pioneers of the second and third waves of immigration. Shemer was buried near the famous Israeli poet Rachel, according to Shemer's wish.

Awards
In 1983, Shemer received the Israel Prize for Hebrew song (words and melody).

Works
 All My Songs (Almost), 1967, published by Yedioth Ahronoth

 The Second Book, copyright 1975, published by Lulav

 Number Three (Sefer Gimel), copyright 1982, published by Lulav

 Book Four (Sefer Arbah), copyright 1995, published by Shva Publishers

See also
 Ada Aharoni
 Karen Alkalay-Gut
 Raquel Chalfi
 Hava Pinchas-Cohen
 Janice Rebibo
 Yona Wallach
 Zelda (poet)
List of Israel Prize recipients

References

External links
 Obituary for Naomi Shemer, Jewish Federations
 Tikkun Toronto

1930 births
2004 deaths
Deaths from cancer in Israel
Israel Prize in Hebrew song recipients
Israel Prize women recipients
Israeli women composers
Jewish Israeli musicians
Israeli women songwriters
Jews in Mandatory Palestine
People from Northern District (Israel)
Israeli women poets
20th-century Israeli women singers